The Kosva is a river in Perm Krai and Sverdlovsk Oblast, Russia, a left tributary of the Kama.
 
The river starts in the western portion of Sverdlovsk Oblast at the confluence of Bolshaya Kosva (Large Kosva), flowing from the Pravdinsky Rock, and Malaya Kosva (Small Kosva), flowing from the southern slope of the Kosvinsky Rock. It flows towards the west, and ends up in a bay of the Kama Reservoir. In the middle parts of the river lies the Shirokovskaya hydroelectric power plant with Shirokovskoe Reservoir. The town of Gubakha is situated by the Kosva.

Main tributaries:
Left: Kyrya; 
Right: Tylay, Typyl, Nyar, Nyur, Pozhva

References

External links 
Kosva in Great Soviet Encyclopedia
Kosva in encyclopedia of Perm Krai 

Rivers of Perm Krai
Rivers of Sverdlovsk Oblast